This is a list of airlines currently operating in Latvia.

Scheduled airlines

Charter airlines

Cargo airlines

See also
 List of defunct airlines of Latvia
 List of defunct airlines of Europe
 List of airlines

References

Airlines
Latvia
Airlines
Latvia
I love you baby so much!!!